Anolis matudai, Matuda's anole, is a species of lizard in the family Dactyloidae. The species is found in Mexico and Guatemala.

References

Anoles
Reptiles described in 1956
Reptiles of Mexico
Reptiles of Guatemala
Taxa named by Hobart Muir Smith